Son Bo-mi is a multiply awarded modern South Korean writer of fiction born in Seoul, South Korea.

Life
Son was born in Seoul, South Korea. Son made her literary debut int 2009 with Silence and she currently teaches creative writings at Kyeonghee University. She is married to writer Kim Jong-ok.

Work
Son is known for writing extremely emotional works (Blanket, Hot Air Balloon, and I'm Leaving Too, Liz) in very dry and calm sentences that paradoxically seem to reveal more feeling through their aridity than they would through overt emotionalism. Her stories often feature elaborate narrative structures that often leave out key ingredients related to the plot. This is partially because many of her works are interrelated and events that have happened in one book are often expected to be known about in the other books, even if they are only referred to most elliptically.

Her important works included Downpour, A Love of Scientist, Stroll, and Lindy Hop For Them. Downpour has been partially translated online, as it was one of her award-winning works.

Awards
 2014 5th Annual Young Artists Award
 2014 21st Kim Joon-Sung Prize
 2013 The 46th Hankook Ilbo Literary Award
 2012 The 3rd annual literary neighborhood young artist award
 2011 Dong-A Ilbo Short Story Award
 2009 21st century Literary short story Division Newcomer Award

Works in English
 Hot Air Balloon (Asia Publishers, 2014)

Works in Korean 
 우연의 신 The Goddess of Chance 2019 
우아한 밤과 고양이들 One Graceful night and cats 2018
디어 랄프 로렌 Dear Ralph Lauren 2017
애드벌룬 Hot Air balloon 2014
 제5회 젊은작가상 수상작품집
 그들에게 린디합을 Lindi Hab for them 2013
 제4회 젊은작가상 수상작품집
 소설 작법 How to Write A Story
 제3회 젊은작가상 수상작품집
 젊은 소설 Young Stories

References 

1980 births
Living people
South Korean novelists
South Korean women writers